Voacanga foetida grows as a tree up to  high, with a trunk diameter of up to . The bark is grey, whitish brown or grey-brown. Its unpleasant-smelling flowers feature a white corolla. The specific epithet foetida is from the Latin meaning "evil-smelling". Habitat is forest from sea-level to  altitude. V. foetida is found in Indonesia, Malaysia and the Philippines.

References

foetida
Trees of Sumatra
Trees of Borneo
Trees of the Philippines
Trees of Java
Plants described in 1826